The Yellow Balloon may refer to:

 The Yellow Balloon (band), a 1967 American sunshine pop band
 "Yellow Balloon", a song by the band
 The Yellow Balloon (film), a 1953 British film